Michail Pelivanidis (born 9 October 1972) is a Greek trampoline gymnast. He represented Greece at the 2004 Summer Olympics in Athens, Greece in the men's trampoline event. He finished in 12th place in the qualification round.

References

External links 
 

Living people
1972 births
Place of birth missing (living people)
Greek male trampolinists
Olympic gymnasts of Greece
Gymnasts at the 2004 Summer Olympics
20th-century Greek people
21st-century Greek people